The 2019 Henan Jianye F.C. season will be Henan Jianye's sixth consecutive season in the Chinese Super League since it started in the 2004 season, and its sixth consecutive season in the top flight of Chinese football. This season Henan Jianye participates in the Chinese Super League and Chinese FA Cup.

Transfers and loans

Squad statistics

Appearances and goals

|-
! colspan=14 style=background:#dcdcdc; text-align:center| Players transferred out during the season

Disciplinary record

Friendlies

Pre-season

Competitions

Chinese Super League

Table

Results summary

Results by round

Matches
All times are local (UTC+8).

Source:

Chinese FA Cup

References

Henan Songshan Longmen F.C. seasons
Henan